Salzbach is a river of Rhineland-Palatinate and Hesse, Germany. It is a right tributary of the Elbbach near Hadamar.

See also
List of rivers of Hesse
List of rivers of Rhineland-Palatinate

Rivers of Rhineland-Palatinate
Rivers of Hesse
Rivers of the Westerwald
Rivers of Germany